Luna Mijović (born 2 December 1991), sometimes credited as Luna Zimić-Mijović is a Bosnian actress. She has appeared in more than ten films since 2006.

Born in Sarajevo to a Serb father Vlastimir Mijović and Bosniak mother Amra (née Zimić), part of Mijović's infancy was spent in Moscow where her journalist father—employed at the time at the state-owned Oslobođenje daily—was stationed as a foreign correspondent.

Selected filmography

References

External links 

1991 births
Living people
Actresses from Sarajevo
Bosnia and Herzegovina film actresses
Bosnia and Herzegovina people of Serbian descent
Bosnia and Herzegovina people of Bosniak descent
21st-century Bosnia and Herzegovina actresses